The 1921 Chichester by-election was held on 23 April 1921.  The by-election was held due to the resignation of the incumbent Coalition Conservative MP, Lord Edmund Talbot.  It was won by the Coalition Conservative candidate William Bird, who was unopposed.

Result

References

1921 elections in the United Kingdom
1921 in England
20th century in Sussex
By-elections to the Parliament of the United Kingdom in West Sussex constituencies
Unopposed by-elections to the Parliament of the United Kingdom (need citation)
Chichester